WWWI (1270 AM) is a radio station in Baxter/Brainerd, Minnesota airing a talk format and simulcasting KLKS 100.1 FM Pequot Lakes. Established in 1987 as WJJY, the station is owned by Jimmy D. Birkemeyer's R & J Broadcasting.

On September 16, 2016, Red Rock Radio announced that it would sell WWWI to R & J Broadcasting as part of an eight station deal; the sale was completed on December 21, 2016.

Previous logo

References

External links

Radio stations in Minnesota
News and talk radio stations in the United States
Radio stations established in 1987
1987 establishments in Minnesota